François Louisy (born December 12, 1921 in Guadeloupe, and died September 17, 2007) was a politician from Guadeloupe who was elected to the French Senate in 1986 .

References 
 page on the French Senate website

Guadeloupean politicians
French people of Guadeloupean descent
French Senators of the Fifth Republic
1921 births
2007 deaths
Senators of Guadeloupe